The Journal of Vertebrate Paleontology is a bimonthly peer-reviewed scientific journal that was established in 1980 by Jiri Zidek (University of Oklahoma). It covers all aspects of vertebrate paleontology, including vertebrate origins, evolution, functional morphology, taxonomy, biostratigraphy, paleoecology, paleobiogeography, and paleoanthropology. The journal is published by Taylor & Francis on behalf of the Society of Vertebrate Paleontology. According to Journal Citation Reports, the journal has a 2017 impact factor of 2.190.

References

External links

Paleontology journals
Publications established in 1980
Quarterly journals
English-language journals
Taylor & Francis academic journals